The 42nd Street station was a station on the demolished IRT Sixth Avenue Line in Manhattan, New York City. It had 2 tracks and two side platforms. It was served by trains from the IRT Sixth Avenue Line, and was located near sites such as the New York Public Library headquarters, Bryant Park, and the New York Hippodrome. The station opened on June 5, 1878, and closed on December 4, 1938. The next southbound stop was 38th Street. The next northbound stop was 50th Street. Two years later, the rapid transit needs of the intersection were replaced by the IND Sixth Avenue Line platforms of the 42nd Street–Bryant Park/Fifth Avenue subway station complex.

References

IRT Sixth Avenue Line stations
Railway stations closed in 1938
Former elevated and subway stations in Manhattan
1938 disestablishments in New York (state)

Sixth Avenue
Railway stations in the United States opened in 1878
1878 establishments in New York (state)